Robert G. Frey (born 1938 or 1939) is an American former politician who served in the Kansas State Senate and Kansas House of Representatives as a Republican from 1975 to 1988.

Frey was born in Wisconsin, and moved to Kansas after being discharged from the U.S. Air Force in Wichita in 1962. He attended Wichita State University. He graduated from Washburn University School of Law in 1970, after which he moved to Liberal, Kansas, where he became county attorney and founded a law practice.

In 1974, Frey successfully ran for an open seat in the Kansas House. He spent the next ten years in the House, eventually rising to the post of Majority Leader and chairing the Judiciary Committee. Frey identified as a moderate Republican during his time in the legislature. In 1984, he successfully ran for the Kansas Senate, but served only one term before unexpectedly losing his 1988 re-election campaign to Democrat Janice McClure. 

After he left the Senate, Frey worked as a lobbyist for the Kansas Trial Lawyers Association. In 1995, he was appointed to the State Board of Tax Appeals by Governor Bill Graves.

References

Year of birth missing (living people)
Living people
20th-century American politicians
Republican Party Kansas state senators
Republican Party members of the Kansas House of Representatives
People from Liberal, Kansas
District attorneys in Kansas
Kansas lawyers
American lobbyists
Wichita State University alumni
Washburn University School of Law alumni
United States Air Force airmen